Beriyanwala is a village of Bhawana Tehsil in Punjab, Pakistan. It is located on the Bhawana-Painsra road with a population of 1,500. Most residents of this area are Jappa family.

Villages in Chiniot District
Chiniot District